Concerto is a live album by Roxy Music. All tracks were recorded during the group's "Manifesto Tour" at the Rainbow Music Hall, Denver, Colorado on April 12, 1979, except for Mother of Pearl and Editions of You, which were recorded earlier that month at the Oakland Auditorium, Oakland, California. The album was released in 2001; three years after it was previously released as Concert Classics in 1998 (which does not include the final two tracks). It was released again (with the same track listing) under the title Ladytron on August 19, 2002 on Superior Records. Roxy Music had no input to this album as it is not an official Roxy Music release but released under license.

Track listing
All tracks by Bryan Ferry except where noted.

 "Manifesto" (Ferry, Phil Manzanera) – 5:39
 "Angel Eyes" (Ferry, Andy Mackay) – 3:57
 "Trash" (Ferry, Manzanera) – 2:54
 "Out of the Blue" (Ferry, Manzanera) – 5:18
 "A Song for Europe" (Ferry, Mackay) – 6:25
 "Still Falls the Rain" (Ferry, Manzanera) – 4:29
 "Ain't That So" – 5:55
 "Stronger Through the Years" – 8:23
 "Ladytron" – 5:29
 "In Every Dream Home a Heartache" – 9:06
 "Love Is the Drug" (Ferry, Mackay) – 3:50
 "Do the Strand" – 4:08
 "Re-make/Re-model" – 4:05
 "Mother of Pearl" – 6:43*
 "Editions of You" – 3:43*

Recorded Oakland, CA

Personnel 
Roxy Music
Bryan Ferry – lead vocals, keyboards
Andy Mackay – saxophone, oboe, synthesizer
Phil Manzanera – guitars
Dave Skinner – keyboards, backing vocals
Gary Tibbs – bass, backing vocals
Paul Thompson- drums, percussion
Technical
John W. Edwards – compilation production, mastering
Carlton P. Sandercock – project coordinator

References

2001 live albums
Roxy Music live albums